Uniontown Area High School is a comprehensive public high school serving around 975 students in grades 9-12 who reside in the Uniontown Area School District in Fayette County, Pennsylvania.

History
Uniontown opened in 1911 and was renovated and added in 1954 and 1979 and has a gymnasium with balconies, an auditorium, natatorium, woodshop, metal shop, and graphics shop. As of January 2012, the school is undergoing renovations to relieve overcrowding issues and aging to the existing structure. In January 2018, a mass shooting was averted when a student was discovered with multiple weapons at his house.

Graduation requirements
All students are required to complete 26 credits of coursework, as well as complete a graduation project and score proficient or above on the Pennsylvania System of State Assessments. The breakdown in how a student earns their credits depends on whether or not they attend the Fayette County Career and Technical Institute.

Coursework Breakdown

Course offerings
UHS is several course offerings, including:
 Business/Computer/Information Technology - Including a Graphic Arts program
 Health and Physical Education
 Fine Arts - Music and Art
 World Languages - Including French and Spanish
 Language Arts
 Mathematics
 Practical Arts (Family and Consumer Sciences/Technology Education) -  Includes: Publications, Drafting and Design, Manufacturing, Construction and Agile Robotics
 Science
 Social Studies

Vocational Education
Students in grades 10-12 have the opportunity to attend the Fayette County Career and Technical Institute in nearby Georges Township part-time if they wish to pursue a certain trade that they offer.

Athletics
Uniontown is a member of the Western Pennsylvania Interscholastic Athletic League, which is District VII (7) of the Pennsylvania Interscholastic Athletic Association.

Notable alumni
 Nick Ognovich, former NY Yankees Football, All-American Football Con.; WFU Hall of Fame
 Harry Clarke, former NFL player
 Tory Epps, former NFL player
 John D. Faris, American Chorbishop
 Ben Gregory, former NFL player
 Gene Huey, former NFL player
 Tom Hull, former NFL player
 Stu Lantz, former NBA player and broadcaster
 Pete Marcus, former NFL player
 Roger Miller, former MLB player
 Chuck Muncie, former NFL player
 Bill Munsey, former CFL player
 Nelson Munsey, former NFL player
 Ray Parson, former NFL player
 Sandy Stephens, former CFL player

References

Schools in Fayette County, Pennsylvania
Public high schools in Pennsylvania
Educational institutions established in 1910
1910 establishments in Pennsylvania